In agriculture, a terrace is a piece of sloped plane that has been cut into a series of successively receding flat surfaces or platforms, which resemble steps, for the purposes of more effective farming. This type of landscaping is therefore called terracing. Graduated terrace steps are commonly used to farm on hilly or mountainous terrain. Terraced fields decrease both erosion and surface runoff, and may be used to support growing crops that require irrigation, such as rice. The Rice Terraces of the Philippine Cordilleras have been designated as a UNESCO World Heritage Site because of the significance of this technique.

Uses 

Terraced paddy fields are used widely in rice, wheat and barley farming in east, south, southwest, and southeast Asia, as well as the Mediterranean Basin, Africa, and South America. Drier-climate terrace farming is common throughout the Mediterranean Basin, where they are used for vineyards, olive trees, cork oak, and other crops.

Ancient history

Terracing is also used for sloping terrain; the Hanging Gardens of Babylon may have been built on an artificial mountain with stepped terraces, such as those on a ziggurat. At the seaside Villa of the Papyri in Herculaneum, the villa gardens of Julius Caesar's father-in-law were designed in terraces to give pleasant and varied views of the Bay of Naples.

Intensive terrace farming is believed to have been practiced before the early 15th century AD in West Africa. Terraces were used by many groups, notably the Mafa, Ngas, Gwoza, and the Dogon.

Recent history
It was long held that steep mountain landscapes are not conducive to, or do not even permit, agricultural mechanization. In the 1970s in the European Alps, pasture farms began mechanizing the management of alpine pastures and harvesting of forage grasses through use of single axle two-wheel tractors (2WTs) and very low center of gravity articulated steering 4-wheel tractors. Their designs by various European manufacturers were initially quite simple but effective, allowing them to cross slopes approaching 20%.  In the 2000s new designs of wheels and tires, tracks, etc, and incorporation of electronics for better and safer control, allowed these machines to operate on slopes greater than 20% with various implements such as reaper-harvesters, rakes, balers, and transport trailers.

In Asian sub-tropical countries, a similar process has begun with the introduction of smaller, lower-tech and much lower-priced 2WTs in the 4-9 horsepower range that can be safely operated in the small, narrow terraces, and are light enough to be lifted and lowered from one terrace to the next. What is different from the Alpine use is that these 2WTs are being used for tillage and crop establishment of maize, wheat, and potato crops, and with their small 60-70cm-wide rotovators and special cage wheels are puddling the terraces for transplanted and broadcast rice. Farmers are also using the engines as stationary power sources for powering water pumps and threshers. Even more recently farmers are experimenting with use of small reaper-harvester attachments. In Nepal, the low costs of these mostly Chinese-made machines and the increased productivity they produce have meant that this scale-appropriate machinery is spreading across Nepal's Himalaya Mountains and likely into the other countries of the Himalaya and Hindu Kush.

South America
In the South American Andes, farmers have used terraces, known as andenes, for over a thousand years to farm potatoes, maize, and other native crops. Terraced farming was developed by the Wari culture and other peoples of the south-central Andes before 1000 AD, centuries before they were used by the  Inca, who adopted them. The terraces were built to make the most efficient use of shallow soil and to enable irrigation of crops by allowing runoff to occur through the outlet.

The Inca people built on these, developing a system of canals, aqueducts, and puquios to direct water through dry land and increase fertility levels and growth. These terraced farms are found wherever mountain villages have existed in the Andes. They provided the food necessary to support the populations of great Inca cities and religious centres such as Machu Picchu.

Canary Islands

Terraced fields are common in islands with steep slopes. The Canary Islands present a complex system of terraces covering the landscape from the coastal irrigated plantations to the dry fields in the highlands. These terraces, which are named cadenas (chains), are built with stone walls of skillful design, which include attached stairs and channels.

England

In Old English, a terrace was also called a "lynch" (lynchet). An example of an ancient Lynch Mill is in Lyme Regis. The water is directed from a river by a duct along a terrace. This set-up was used in steep hilly areas in the UK.

Japan

In Japan, some of the 100 Selected Terraced Rice Fields (in Japanese: 日本の棚田百選一覧), from Iwate in the north to Kagoshima in the south, are slowly disappearing, but volunteers are helping the farmers both to maintain their traditional methods and for sightseeing purposes.

Gallery

See also
 Anden
 Honghe Hani Rice Terraces
 Yuanyang County, Yunnan
 Banaue Rice Terraces
 Rice Terraces of the Philippine Cordilleras
 Satoyama
 Terrace garden
 Terraced wall

References

External links

Terrace Fields around the World

Agricultural terminology
Articles containing video clips
Artificial landforms